The 67th Rifle Division was an infantry division of the Red Army.
The 20th Rifle Division (territorial defence) was formed from militia brigades in the Leningrad Military District in 1923. On  May 21, 1936, it was named the 67th Rifle Division. In June 1941, was part of the 27th Army in the Baltic Special Military District. After being badly battered during the early part of Operation Barbarossa, it was disbanded 19 September 1941.

Re-formed in September 1941. Fought on Finnish front. With 14th Army in northern Norway May 1945.

In 1957, it became the 116th Motor Rifle Division, but was then disbanded in 1960. For some part of the postwar period it was part of the 6th Army (Soviet Union).

Structure
56 Rifle Regiment
114 Rifle Regiment
281 Rifle Regiment
94 Artillery Regiment
242 Artillery Regiment
Smaller units

References

 

067
Military units and formations established in 1923
Military units and formations disestablished in 1957
1923 establishments in the Soviet Union
1957 disestablishments in the Soviet Union